"White Room" is a 1968 song by rock group Cream.

The term may also refer to:


Film and TV
White Room (film), a 1990 Canadian film
The White Room (UK TV series), a 1990s British music TV show  
The White Room (Australian TV series), a 2010 Australian TV show

Music
The White Room (KLF album), a 1991 album by the band The KLF
The White Room (Jonathan Thulin album), a 2012 album by Swedish-American musician Jonathan Thulin

Other 
 White room (spaceflight), an environmentally controlled chamber, part of a launch complex
 White room (torture), a sensory deprivation environment used in white torture

See also
White space (disambiguation)